Stružná (until 1949 Kysibl) is a municipality and village in Karlovy Vary District in the Karlovy Vary Region of the Czech Republic. It has about 600 inhabitants.

Administrative parts
Villages of Horní Tašovice, Nová Víska, Peklo and Žalmanov are administrative parts of Stružná.

History
The first written mention of Stružná is from 1378. Until 1949, it was called Kysibl.

References

Villages in Karlovy Vary District